Attaku Yamudu Ammayiki Mogudu is a 1989 Indian Telugu-language masala film co-written and directed by A. Kodandarami Reddy. Produced by Allu Aravind, the film stars Chiranjeevi, Vanisri, and Vijayashanti. The film marks Vanisri's comeback to cinema after several years.

Released on 14 January 1989, the film was a major commercial success. It was eventually remade in Tamil as Maapillai (1989), in Hindi as Jamai Raja (1990), in Bengali as Sasurbari Zindabad (2000) and also inspired other Indian films with similar themes.

Plot
Kalyan is an unemployed, lower class, but simple and humble do-gooder. Rekha is the loving daughter of arrogant businesswoman Chamundeswari.  Kalyan, one day, ruins the engagement of Rekha's friend. Rekha at first thinks that Kalyan did this to her friend but later learns that her friend was getting married against her wish. Rekha and Kalyan later fall in love. Meanwhile, Rekha's mother Chamundeswari rejects Kalyan's sister's love with Rekha's' brother. Kalyan learns that Rekha is Chamundeswari's daughter and decides to marry Rekha. Chamundeswari takes her daughter to her house. Kalyan is enraged and challenges that he would marry Rekha. Kalyan and Chamundeswari fight over authority. The rest of the movie is about how Kalyan and Chamundeswari resolve their differences and how Kalyan wins back Rekha.

Cast

Chiranjeevi as Kalyan
Vanisri as Chamundeswari Devi
Vijayashanti as Rekha
Kaikala Satyanarayana as Ramachandrayya, Chamundeswari Devi's husband
Rao Gopal Rao 
Allu Ramalingaiah
Brahmanandam
Giribabu
Sudhakar as Rekha's brother
Annapoorna as Kalyan's mother

Soundtrack

Remakes

References

External links

1980s Telugu-language films
1989 films
Films directed by A. Kodandarami Reddy
Films scored by K. Chakravarthy
Geetha Arts films
1980s masala films
Telugu films remade in other languages